This page provides a list of the largest deals for books and book series to date. It differentiates from the list of best-selling books in that book deals are secured before the book is released, and often before the book is completed. The books are listed according to the highest book deal estimate as reported in reliable, independent sources.

American authors hold the record for the largest book deals made for individual books (Bill Clinton and Britney Spears), and for book series (James Patterson and Barack and Michelle Obama). While Patterson's book deal with Hachette Book Group is by far the largest for a book series, Patterson has disputed the reported amount.

Contrary to popular belief, J. K. Rowling's advances for the individual Harry Potter books or series overall do not appear on this list. For the first two books in the series (1997's Harry Potter and the Philosopher's Stone and 1998's Harry Potter and the Chamber of Secrets), she received an advance of £2,000 apiece. Rowling's later book The Casual Vacancy, released in 2012 and not affiliated with the Harry Potter series, does appear on this list.

List of largest deals for individual books
These book deals share some facts in common: The top five book deals have been memoirs and their authors have all been American.

Note: book deals are listed at the time the book deal was made and not adjusted for inflation.

List of largest deals for books series
Note: book series deals are listed at the time the deal was made and not adjusted for inflation.

See also 

 List of best-selling fiction authors
 List of bestselling novels in the United States
 List of literary works by number of languages translated into
 Lists of books

Notes

References 

Literature records